Ambérieux-en-Dombes (literally Ambérieux in Dombes) is a commune in the department of Ain in the Auvergne-Rhône-Alpes region of eastern France.

The inhabitants of the commune are known as Ambarrois or Ambarroises

Geography
As its name suggests, Ambérieux-en-Dombes is a part of the Dombes country in Ain. It is located some 10 km east of Villefranche-sur-Saone and 35 km north of Lyon. There are several access roads to the commune: the D904 comes from Savigneux in the west through the heart of the commune and the town and continues east to Lapeyrouse; the D66 road from Saint-Trivier-sur-Moignans in the north passes through the town and continues south to Saint-Jean-de-Thurigneux; the D660 comes from Rancé in the south-west to the town; and the D82 comes from Monthieux in the south-east and continues to Chatillon-sur-Chalaronne in the north-east. All of these roads intersect in or very near the town.

There is a network of country roads covering the commune which is entirely farmland outside the built-up areas. Apart from the town there is the hamlet of La Jonchay to the north-east of the town.

There are many étangs or ponds in the commune, particularly in the east but almost no waterways.

History

The village was known as Ambariacum in the 6th century and the land belonged to the castles of the first Burgundian kings.

On 13 July 1922 a train of the Compagnie des Tramways de l'Ain returning pilgrims from Ars-sur-Formans derailed between Ambérieux-en-Dombes and Lapeyrouse leaving one dead and several injured.

Heraldry

Administration

List of Successive Mayors of Ambérieux-en-Dombes

Population

Culture and heritage

Sites and monuments

The Chateau of Ambérieux-en-Dombes (15th century) is registered as an historical monument. It was built between 1370 and 1376 (dendrochronological study) during the reign of Humbert V of Thoire and Villars. It is located in the centre of the village today and still has four towers - three square towers 19 metres tall and a round tower of small diameter which served as a prison. The dungeon has been completely restored with the installation of a new roof in 2010.
The War Memorial has the feature of being topped by a rooster.

Notable people linked to the commune
Laurent Capponi (1512-1573), Lord of Ambérieux-en-Dombes
Jean Saint-Cyr (1899-1990), French politician, born in Ambérieux-en-Dombes
Gundobad, the 6th-century king of the Burgundians, born in the commune

See also
 Dombes
Communes of the Ain department

References

External links
Ambérieux-en-Dombes on the La Dombes website 
Ambérieux-en-Dombes official website 
Ambérieux-en-Dombes on Géoportail, National Geographic Institute (IGN) website 
Amberieux en Dombe on the 1750 Cassini Map

Communes of Ain
Dombes
Ambarri